Pseudolampetis is a genus of beetles in the family Buprestidae, containing the following species:

 Pseudolampetis aequatoris (Obenberger, 1924)
 Pseudolampetis bilineata (Latreille, 1813)
 Pseudolampetis boliviana Obenberger, 1939
 Pseudolampetis camposi (Théry, 1907)
 Pseudolampetis cincta (Kerremans, 1897)
 Pseudolampetis circumsulcata (Laporte & Gory, 1837)
 Pseudolampetis elytralis (Obenberger, 1917)
 Pseudolampetis fasciata (Kerremans, 1919)
 Pseudolampetis luteitarsis (Moore, 1986)
 Pseudolampetis plagiata (Kerremans, 1919)
 Pseudolampetis rossi (Cobos, 1969)
 Pseudolampetis soukupi Obenberger, 1939
 Pseudolampetis weyrauchi (Cobos, 1969)

References

Buprestidae genera